Donald Vincent Davey (born April 8, 1968 in Scottsville, New York) is a former American football defensive tackle in the National Football League. He was drafted by the Green Bay Packers in the third round of the 1991 NFL Draft. He attended Manitowoc Lincoln High School where he played football.  He played college football at Wisconsin.  He currently owns Firehouse Subs restaurants in Wisconsin and Florida.

Davey also played for the Jacksonville Jaguars.

References

1968 births
Living people
People from Monroe County, New York
People from Manitowoc, Wisconsin
Players of American football from New York (state)
Players of American football from Wisconsin
American football defensive tackles
American football defensive ends
Wisconsin Badgers football players
Green Bay Packers players
Jacksonville Jaguars players